
This is a list of aircraft in alphabetical order beginning with 'Co' through to 'Cz'.

Co–Cz

Co-Z
(Co-Z Development Co, Mesa, AZ)
 Cozy Mark III
 Cozy Mark IV
 CoZ Europe Cosy

Coandă 
(Henri Coandă)
 Coandă-1910
 Coandă-Delauney-Belleville pusher fighter
 Coandă No.4 (Coandă-Delauney-Belleville pusher fighter)

Coates Swalesong 

 Coates Swalesong S.A.I
 Coates Swalesong S.A.II
 Coates Swalesong S.A.III

Coavio

(Coavio srl, Ferentino, Italy)
Coavio DF 2000

Cobalt 

(Cobalt Aircraft industries, Airparc 6C,Avenue de l'Europe, 78117 Toussous le-Noble)
 Cobalt Co50

Cobra
(Cobra Aviation)
 Cobra Arrow

Codock 

(Cockatoo Dockyard & Engineering Co)
 CoDock LJW-6

Coddington & Webb 

(C C Coddington & Magnum Webb, Charlotte, NC)
 Coddington & Webb 1910 aeroplane

Cody 

 British Army Aeroplane No. 1
 Cody II
 Cody III
 Cody IV monoplane
 Cody V
 Cody Floatplane
 Cody Michelin Cup Biplane
 Cody Circuit of Britain biplane

Coelho 

(Altair Coelho)
 Coelho AC.1
 Super Rotor AC.4 Andorinha
 Coelho AC.11

Coffyn 

(Frank Coffyn, Knoxville, TN)
 Coffyn 1910 Hydro-Aeroplane

Coffman 

((Sam H) Coffman-(C R) Strong Aircraft Co)
 Coffman 3-B
 Coffman A
 Coffman Air Coupe
 Coffman C-1 Racer
 Coffman Junior
 Coffman Monoplane Special
 Coffman-Ranger W

Colani 

(Luigi Colani / Colani/Composite Engineering (CCE))
 Colani Cormoran
 Colani Pontresina

Colden 

(Milton Colden, Clintonville, WI)
 Colden C-1 Cyclops (a.k.a. MWP)

Cole (aircraft constructor) 

 Cole Parasol Monoplane

Cole 

(Cole School of Aviation/Cole Aircraft Corp, 3617 Euclid Ave, Cleveland, OH)
 Cole Model 1
 Cole Sport
 Cole commercial

Cole 

(Ross A Cole, Dallas, TX)
 Cole 1929 circular wing aircraft

Cole 

(J Raymond Cole, Oklahoma City, OK)
 Cole 1933 monoplane

Coleman 

(L J Coleman, Sioux City, IA)
 Coleman Speed Scout

Colgate-Larsen 

(1940: (Gilbert) Colgate-(Victor A) Larsen Aircraft Co, Amityville, NY)
 Colgate-Larsen CL-15

Collard-Souquet-Raniéri

(Maurice Collard, Jacques Souquet & Jacques Raniéri)
 Collard-Souquet-Raniéri CSR.1 Tsé-Tsé

Collier 

((William S) Collier Aircraft Sales, Tulsa, OK)
 Collier Ambassador Trainer
 Collier CA-1 Ambassador
 Collier T-21-1

Collier-Combs 

((William S) Collier & (L A) Combs Aircraft Co, Ponca City, OK)
 Collier-Combs Commercial Cabin

Collins 

(DeWitt Collins, Winthrop, IA)
 Collins Aerodyne
 Collins X-112 Aerofoil Boat

Collins 

(Collins Radio Co, Marine Lab, Cedar Rapids, IL)
 Collins Special

Collins 

(Collins Aero, Chadds Ford, PA)
 Collins Dipper
 Collins W-7 Dipper

Collivier 

 Collivier CO-02
 Collivier CO-04
 Collivier DR 100

Colomban

(Michel Colomban)
 Colomban MC-10 Cri-Cri
 Colomban MC-12 Cri-Cri
 Colomban MC-15 Cri-Cri
 Colomban MC-22 Cri-Cri
 Colomban MC-30 Luciole
 Colomban MC-100 Ban-Bi
 Colomban-Robin MCR4S

Colonial

(1946: Colonial Aircraft Corp (Fdr: David B Thurston), Huntington Station, Long Island, NY, 1955: Moved to Sanford, ME (Pres: Herbert Lindblad), 1959: Acquired by Lake Aircraft Corp.)
 Colonial Skimmer

Columbia 

((Willis C) Brown-(Richard) Young a.k.a. Columbia Aircraft Co.)
 Columbia BY-1
 Columbia Sesquiplane
 Columbia Model 2

Columbia 

  
 Columbia 300
 Columbia 350
 Columbia 400

Columbia 

(Columbia Air Liners Inc (Fdr: Charles A Levine), Hempstead (Valley Stream), NY. Seen as a division of Grumman during WW2, but if this was fact, substantiation was not found. 1946: Acquired by Commonwealth Aircraft Corp.
 Columbia CAL-1 Triad
 Columbia Uncle Sam
 Grumman J2F Duck
 Columbia JL

Colyaer

(Colyaer SL, Portonovo, Spain)
Colyaer Mascato S100
Colyaer Martin3 S100
Colyaer Gannet S100
Colyaer Freedom S100

Comac 

 Comac C919
 Comac C929
 Comac C939
 Comac ARJ21
 Comac ARJ21-700
 Comac ARJ21-900

Combscraft 

(Combs Aircraft Corp, Combs Field, Denver, CO)
 Combscraft 1939 monoplane

Comco Ikarus 

Ikarus Sherpa
Ikarus C22
Ikarus C42
Ikarus C52
Ikarus 500

Command-Aire 
(Command-Aire Inc / Arkansas Aircraft Company, Little Rock, AR)
 Command-Aire 3C3
 Command-Aire 4C3
 Command-Aire 5C3
 Command-Aire BS-14
 Command-Aire BS-15 (likely a typo as none of their sources mention a 15)
 Command-Aire BS-16
 Command-Aire Cotton Duster
 Command-Aire MR-1 Little Rocket racer

Commander 

(Commander Aircraft Co)
 Commander 112
 Commander 114
 Commander 115
 Commander Fanjet 1500

Commercial 

(Commercial Aircraft Corp, Metropolitan Airport, Van Nuys, CA)
 Commercial C-1 Sunbeam
 Commercial Sumbeam C-102
 Commercial Sunbeam C-2
 Commercial Sunbeam Pup LP-1

Commonwealth 

 CAC CA-1 Wirraway
 CAC CA-2 Wackett
 CAC CA-3 Wirraway
 CAC CA-4 Woomera
 CAC CA-5 Wirraway
 CAC CA-6 Wackett
 CAC CA-7 Wirraway
 CAC CA-8 Wirraway
 CAC CA-9 Wirraway
 CAC CA-10 Wirraway
 CAC CA-11 Woomera
 CAC CA-12 Boomerang
 CAC CA-13 Boomerang
 CAC CA-14 Boomerang
 CAC CA-15
 CAC CA-16 Wirraway
 CAC CA-17 Mustang
 CAC CA-18 Mustang
 CAC CA-19 Boomerang
 CAC CA-20 Wirraway
 CAC CA-22 Winjeel
 CAC CA-23
 CAC CA-24
 CAC CA-25 Winjeel
 CAC CA-26 Sabre
 CAC CA-27 Sabre
 CAC CA-28 Ceres
 CAC CA-29 Mirage
 CAC CA-30
 CAC CA-32 Kiowa
 CAC AA107

Commonwealth 

(1943: Commonwealth Aircraft Co, Kansas City, KS, reorganized from Rearwin Co to build assault gliders, 1949: Valley Stream, NY)
 Commonwealth 185 Skyranger
 Commonwealth C-170 Trimmer

Commuter 

(Commuter Aircraft Corp, Youngstown, OH)
 Commuter CAC-100

Commuter Craft 

 Commuter Craft Innovator

Comp Air 
(Aerocomp Inc, Merritt Island, FL / Comp Air)
 Comp Air 3
 Comp Air 4
 Comp Air 6
 Comp Air 7
 Comp Air 8
 Comp Air 9
 Comp Air 10
 Comp Air 11
 Comp Air 12
 Comp Air Jet
 Aerocomp Merlin

Compagnie Française d'Aviation 

(Compagnie Française d'Aviation – C.F.A. – Division of Salmson)

Compcop 

(Compcop Inc (Pres: Stephen Geraghty), Redwood City, CA)
 Compcop Boon Junior
 Compcop G-1

Comper

(see Fane for Comper Fane, which was started by Nick Comper and finished by Gerard Fane)
Comper Swift
Comper Mouse
Comper Streak
Comper Kite
Comper Scamp
Comper Fly

Composite 

(Composite Aircraft Corporation)
 Composite/Windecker Eagle
 Composite Eagle TC

Compton 

(Rollo L Compton, San Antonio, TX)
 Compton Special

Comstock 

(David Comstock, Roundup, MT)
 Comstock 1932 monoplane

Comte 

(Flugzeugbau A. Comte / Robert Wild)
 Comte AC-1
 Comte AC-3
 Comte AC-4
 Comte AC-8
 Comte AC-11-V
 Comte AC-12 Moskito
 Wild DT
 Wild 43
 Wild X biplane

Con Ellingston 

(Con D Ellingston & Earl E Hansen, Great Falls, MT)
 Con Ellingston Special

Conair 

 Conair Firecat

Conal 

 Conal W-151 Willi

Concept Aviation

(Knoxville, TN)
Concept Prowler

Concept Composites

(Pouance, France)
Concept Composites MD03 Transat

Condit 

(Clifford Condit, Partridge, IL)
 Condit Experimental

Condor 

(Condor Aero Inc.)
 Condor Shoestring

Condor 

(Condor Aircraft)
 Condor Aircraft Condor
 Condor Aircraft Condor II
 Condor Aircraft Condor III

Condry & Stephen 

(Condry & (Lawrence) Stephen, San Jose, CA)
 Condry Solo Sportster

Conn One Design 

(Daytona Beach, FL)
 Conn One Design

Connecticut

 Connecticut Aircraft Company DN-1 Airship/Blimp
 Connecticut Aircraft Company A-class Blimp
 Connecticut Aircraft Company B-class Blimp

Conquist 

(Clifford Condit & Gus Palmquist, Milwaukee, WI)
 Conquist 1934 monoplane

Conrad 

(Ronald Conrad, Earl Player, Jack Buttons, Salt Lake City, UT)
 Conrad Bumblebee

Conrad

(Roland Conrad, Salt Lake, UT)
 Conrad Bumblebee

Conroy
(Conroy aircraft / Jack Conroy)
 Conroy Skymonster
 Conroy Stolifter
 Conroy Turbo Albatross
 Conroy Turbo Three
 Conroy Tri-Turbo-Three

Consolidated 

(for later types see Convair)
 Consolidated Model 1 PT-1 Trusty
 Consolidated Model 2 PT-3/NY-1
 Consolidated Model 7 O-17 Courier
 Consolidated Model 8 floatplane variant of model 7
 Consolidated Model 9 XPY-1 Admiral
 Consolidated Model 10
 Consolidated Model 11 Guardian
 Consolidated Model 14 Husky Junior became Fleet Model 1
 Consolidated Model 15 variant of model 7 with Pratt & Whitney R-1340
 Consolidated Model 16 Commodore
 Consolidated Model 17 Fleetster
 Consolidated Model 18 XBY-1 Fleetster
 Consolidated Model 20 Fleetster
 Consolidated Model 21 PT-11/N4Y
 Consolidated Model 22 P2Y Ranger
 Consolidated Model 23 
 Consolidated Model 24 Fleetster
 Consolidated Model 25
 Consolidated Model 26
 Consolidated Model 27 P-30
 Consolidated Model 28 PBY Catalina
 Consolidated Model 29 PB2Y Coronado
 Consolidated Model 30 XPB3Y (cancelled)
 Consolidated Model 31 XP4Y Corregidor
 Consolidated Model 32 B-24 Liberator
 Consolidated Model 33 XB-32 Dominator
 Consolidated Model 34 B-32 Dominator
 Consolidated Model 35 B-36 Peacemaker (initial designation)
 Consolidated Model 36 B-36 Peacemaker
 Consolidated Model 37 XC-99
 Consolidated Model 38
 Consolidated Model 39 R2Y-1 Liberator Liner 
 Consolidated Model 40 PB4Y-2 Privateer
 Consolidated A-11
 Consolidated A-44
 Consolidated AT-22
 Consolidated B-24 Liberator
 Consolidated B-32 Dominator
 Consolidated B-41 Liberator
 Consolidated BT-6
 Consolidated BT-7
 Consolidated BY Fleetster
 Consolidated B2Y
 Consolidated C-11 Fleetster
 Consolidated C-22 Fleetster
 Consolidated C-87 Liberator Express
 Consolidated C-109 Liberator Express
 Consolidated F-7
 Consolidated NY Trusty
 Consolidated N2Y
 Consolidated N3Y
 Consolidated N4Y
 Consolidated O-17 Courier
 Consolidated OA-10 Catalina
 Consolidated P-25
 Consolidated P-27
 Consolidated P-28
 Consolidated P-30
 Consolidated P-33
 Consolidated PB-2
 Consolidated PBY Catalina
 Consolidated PB2Y Coronado
 Consolidated PB3Y
 Consolidated PB4Y-1 Liberator
 Consolidated PB4Y-2 Privateer
 Consolidated PT-1
 Consolidated XPT-2
 Consolidated PT-3
 Consolidated PT-4
 Consolidated PT-5
 Consolidated PT-6
 Consolidated PT-8
 Consolidated PT-11
 Consolidated PT-12
 Consolidated XPT-933
 Consolidated PY Admiral
 Consolidated P2Y Ranger
 Consolidated P3Y
 Consolidated P4Y Corregidor
 Consolidated P4Y Privateer
 Consolidated P5Y
 Consolidated RY
 Consolidated R2Y
 Consolidated T-32
 Consolidated TBY Sea Wolf
 Consolidated TW-3
 Consolidated Courier
 Consolidated CXP-28
 Consolidated LB-4
 Consolidated LB-5
 Consolidated LB-6
 Consolidated LB-8
 Consolidated LB-9
 Consolidated LB-12
 Consolidated LB-13
 Consolidated LB-14
 Consolidated LB-15
 Consolidated LB-16
 Consolidated LB-17
 Consolidated LB-19
 Consolidated LB-20
 Consolidated LB-22
 Consolidated LB-24
 Consolidated LB-25
 Consolidated LB-26
 Consolidated LB-27
 Consolidated LB-28
 Consolidated LB-29
 Consolidated LB-30
 Consolidated HXC
 Consolidated Navy Experimental Type C Flying-Boat

Constantinescu 

(Cristea Constantinescu)
 Constantinescu C.O.-2

Contender 

(Contender Aircraft Co, Sunnyvale, CA)
 Contender 202
 Contender 303
 Contender 606

Continental 

(Continental Aircraft & Transportation Corp (pres: Fred Leinweber), Phoenix, AZ)
 Continental 1910 Biplane

Continental 

(1929: Continental Aircraft Co, 704 E Douglas, Wichita, KS)
 Continental 1929 aeroplane

Continental

(1912: Continental Aircraft Corp (pres: Hugh Copeland), Amityville, NY)
 Continental KB-1 Military Biplane
 Continental KB-3

Continental 

(Continental Aviation Corp (founders: M W Giddings and E R Willard), Boeing Field, Seattle, WA, 6/26/31: company into receivership)
 Continental 3000

Continental 

(Continental Motors Company, Muskegon and Detroit, MI)
 Continental 1924 Biplane

Continental Copters 

 Continental Copters El Tomcat
 Continental Copters JC-1 Jet-Cat

Convair 

 Convair Model 2
 Convair Model 3
 Convair Model 4
 Convair Model 5
 Convair Model 7
 Convair Model 7-002
 Convair Model 8
 Convair Model 22
 Convair Model 30
 Convair Model 48 Charger
 Convair Model 58-9
 Convair 90
 Convair 100
 Convair 101
 Convair 102
 Convair 103
 Convair 104 Liberator Liner
 Convair 105
 Convair 106 Skycoach
 Convair 109
 Convair 110
 Convair 111
 Convair 116 ConVairCar
 Convair 117
 Convair 118 ConVairCar
 Convair 240
 Convair 300
 Convair 340
 Convair 440
 Convair 540
 Convair 580
 Convair 5800
 Convair 600
 Convair 640
 Convair 660
 Convair 880
 Convair 990
 Convair NX-2
 Convair UC-880
 Convair OA-10
 Convair A-41
 Convair A-44
 Convair B-36
 Convair NB-36
 Convair B-46
 Convair B-53
 Convair B-58 Hustler
 Convair B-60
 Convair C-99
 Convair C-131
 Convair F-7 Sea Dart
 Convair F-92A
 Convair F-102 Delta Dagger
 Convair F-106 Delta Dart
 Convair XFY Pogo
 Convair F2Y Sea Dart
 Convair L-13
 Convair OY
 Convair P-81
 Convair P-92
 Convair P5Y
 Convair P6Y
 Convair PQM-102
 Convair R2Y
 Convair R3Y Tradewind
 Convair R4Y
 Convair Super Hustler
 Convair T-29
 Convair X-6
 Convair X-12
 Convair X-30 NASP

Convertawings 

(Convertawings Inc, Long Island, NY)
 Convertawings Quadrotor A
 Convertawings Quadrotor F

Cook 

(Leon M Cook, Pampa, TX)
 Cook Shifflet

Cook 

((John) Cook Aircraft Corp, Torrance, CA)
 Cook JC-1 Challenger

Cooke 

(Weldon B Cooke, Pittsburg, CA, 1913: Sandusky, OH)
 Cooke#1 1912 Biplane
 Cooke A 1912 Flying Boat
 Cooke 1913 Biplane

Cooke 

(G Carlyle Cooke, Winston-Salem, NC)
 Cooke 1928 Monoplane
 Cooke 1930 Aeroplane
 Cooke 113-G
 Cooke Mono

Cooke 

(Sam Cooke)
 Cooke 1955 Monoplane

Cooley 

(John F Cooley Aerial Navigation Co, Rochester, NY)
 Cooley 1910 Aeroplane

Cooley & Stroben 

(Cooley & Stroben, Woodlake, CA)
 Cooley & Stroben A

Cooney 

(Thomas A Cooney, Indianapolis, IN)
 Cooney R-3
 Cooney Tom Cat

Coonley 

(Harold D Coonley, Miami, FL)
 Coonley Racer Little Toot

Cooper 

(John D Cooper Aeroplane Co, Bridgeport, CT)
 Cooper Training Tractor

Cooper 

(J B Cooper, Bridgeton, MO)
 Cooper S-A-1

Cooper-Travers

 Cooper-Travers Hawk

Copin

(Georges Copin)
 Copin 1911 Monoplan

Copland 

(Harry Depew Copland, Detroit, MI)
 Copland 1911 Biplane

Corben 

(Corben Sport Plane & Supply Co, Peru, IN and Madison, WI)
 Corben 6-S
 Corben 7-AD
 Corben B
 Corben C
 Corben Cabin Ace
 Corben Baby Ace
 Corben Junior Ace
 Corben Super Ace

Corby 

(John Corby)
 Corby CJ-1 Starlet

Corcoran 

(R Stanley Corcoran Co, New Lenox, IL)
 Corcoran 1970 Biplane
 Corcoran 65-1

Cord-Vultee 

(Aircraft Development Div, (Erret L) Cord Mfg Co, Glendale, CA)
 Cord-Vultee V-1

Cordy 

(Harry Cordy, Los Angeles, CA)
 Cordy 1931 Helicopter

Corivi Aviation

(Italy)
Corivi Pegaso

Corman 

(Corman (Erret L Cord & Lucius B Manning) Aircraft Co, Dayton, OH)
 Corman 3000 a.k.a. Weihmiller 3000
 Corman 6000 a.k.a. Stinson SM-6000

Cornelius 

(1930: (George Wilbur) Cornelius Aircraft Co, Glendale, CA, c.1935: Van Nuys, CA, c.1940: Dayton, OH, 1941: Cornelius-Hoepli Co.)
 Cornelius Fre-Wing 
 Cornelius LW-1
 Cornelius Mallard
 Cornelius XFG-1
 Cornelius XBG-3

Cornu 
(Paul Cornu)
 Cornu helicopter

Corvus 
(Corvus Hungary LLC)
 Corvus Fusion
 Corvus Phantom RG
 Corvus Phantom UL
 Corvus Racer 312
 Corvus Racer 540
 Corvus Wild Angel
 Corvus Crusader

Coser-Oonk 
(Joseph Coser & John Oonk, St Louis, MO)
 Coser-Oonk CO-2 Our Lady

Cosmic 
(Cosmic Aircraft Corp, Bridgeport, CT)
 Cosmic CC-1
 Cosmic F-23

Cosmic Wind 
 Little Toni
 Flying Frenchman
 Minnow
 Ballerina
 Miss Cosmic Wind

Cosmik Aviation
(Southam, United Kingdom)
Cosmik Chaser

Cosmos ULM
(Fontaine-lès-Dijon, France)
Cosmos Bison
Cosmos Echo
Cosmos Echo 12
Cosmos Echo Fun
Cosmos Echo Racer
Cosmos Samba
Cosmos Phase II
Cosmos Phase II 503 Chronos 16
Cosmos Phase II 582 Top 12.9
Cosmos Phase III
Cosmos Phase III 912 Top 14.9

Coubasch Monoplane
(L. Coubash)
 Coubasch Monoplane

Cougar 

(Leonard Eaves, Oklahoma City, OK)
 Cougar 1965 Monoplane

Coulaud 

(Coulaud)
 Coulaud Méo

Council for Scientific and Industrial Research
 CSIR Experimental Autogyro II

Coupé-Aviation 
(Jacques Coupé)
 Coupé-Aviation JC-01
 Coupé-Aviation JC-2
 Coupé-Aviation JC-3
 Coupé-Aviation JC-200

Courier 
(Courier Monoplane Co)
 Courier MT-1 (a.k.a. TK-100)
 Courier PB-1

Courtès 
(Jean-Claude Courtès)
 Jean-Claude Courtès JCC.01

Courtois-Suffit Lescop

(Société Anonyme d'Applications Industrielles du Bois)
 Courtois-Suffit Lescop CSL C1
 Courtois-Suffit Lescop Clerget engined fighter

Coutant 

(Société de Constructions Navales du Léman de Thonon-Les Bains)
 Coutant RMC 17

Coutou 
(Coutou)
 Coutou Cri-cri

Couyaud 
(Germain Couyaud)
 Couyaud GC.01

Couzinet
(Société des Avions René Couzinet / René Couzinet)
 Couzinet 10 'Arc en Ciel'
 Couzinet 20
 Couzinet 21
 Couzinet 22
 Couzinet 27 'Arc en Ciel'
 Couzinet 30
 Couzinet 33
 Couzinet 33 No.2
 Couzinet 40
 Couzinet 70 'Arc en Ciel III'
 Couzinet 80
 Couzinet 100
 Couzinet 101
 Couzinet 103
 Couzinet RC360
 Air-Couzinet AC-10
 Air-Couzinet 20B4

Cove 

(Cove Biplane Co)
 Cove 1911 Biplane

Coventry Ordnance Works 

 COW Biplane

Coward
(Ken S. Coward)
 Coward WeeBee

Cox 

(Joseph A Cox, 107 S Shield St, Knox, IN, 1928: Starke County Aviation Club.)
 Cox C (later renamed 'Mickey Mouse')

Cox-Klemin 

 Cox-Klemin CK-1
 Cox-Klemin CK-2
 Cox-Klemin CK-3
 Cox-Klemin CK-14
 Cox-Klemin CK-18 Sea hawk
 Cox-Klemin CK-19
 Cox-Klemin CO-1
 Cox-Klemin CO-2
 Cox-Klemin Night Hawk
 Cox-Klemin TW-2
 Cox-Klemin XA-1
 Cox-Klemin XO-4
 Cox-Klemin XS

CPA

(Chantiers de Provence Aviation)
 CPA 1

Craft Aerotech 

(Craft Aerotech, Missoula, MT)
 Craft Aerotech 200
 Craft Aerotech 200FW

Crane 

(James A Crane, Ellsworth ME.)
 Crane 1929 Ornithopter

Cranfield Institute of Technology

 Cranfield A1 (1967)

Cranwell

(Cranwell Light Aeroplane Club, United Kingdom)
 Cranwell C.L.A. Glider 1923
 Cranwell CLA.1
 Cranwell CLA.2
 Cranwell CLA.3
 Cranwell CLA.4
 Cranwell CLA.5
 Cranwell CLA.6
 Cranwell CLA.7 Swift

Crawford 

((Harvey J) Crawford, Puyallup, WA)
 Crawford 1908 Biplane
 Crawford-Colvin 1911 Biplane
 Crawford 1913 Biplane

Crawford 

(Crawford All-Metal Airplane Co Inc, Los Angeles, CA)
 Crawford A-1
 Crawford C-1
 Crawford CLM
 Crawford Commercial
 Crawford Courier
 Crawford Powered Glider (a series of powered primary's)
 Crawford WFC Special
 Crawford Runabout
 Crawford Special
 Crawford-Watanabe Sport
 Crawford-Watanabe Courier

Crawford & Howden
 Crawford & Howden monoplane

CRDA CANT 

(see CANT)

Creative Flight 

 Creative Flight Aerocat
 Creative Flight Aerocat SR
 Creative Flight Aerocat SRX
 Creative Flight Aerocat TR

Cricket Gyroplanes Ltd

 Campbell Cricket

Criquet Aviation

(Guaymaral, Colombia)
Criquet Storch

Crocker-Hewitt 

(Francis B Crocker and Peter Cooper-Hewitt)
 Crocker-Hewitt 1917 Helicopter

Croisé 

(Alain Croisé)
 Croisé AC.1

Cromley 

(1912: (C D) Cromley Multiplane Co, Reno, NV)
 Cromley 1912 Multiplane
 Cromley Helicopter

Cromwell 

(Forrest E Cromwell, Wetmore, KS)
 Cromwell A-1

Crosby 

(Harry Crosby, Burbank, CA)
 Crosby CR-3 (a.k.a. C6R-3)
 Crosby CR-4

Croses 

(Emilien Croses)
 Croses EC-1 Pouplume
 Croses EC-2 Pouplume
 Croses EAC-3 Pouplume
 Croses EC-6 Criquet
 Croses LC-6
 Croses-Bujon BEC-7 Tous Terrains
 Croses EC-8 Tourisme
 Croses EC-9 Para-Cargo
 Croses LC-10 Criquet
 Croses-Noêl CN.1

Crosley 

(1929: (Powel) Crosley Aircraft Mfg Div, Crosley Radio & Electronics Co, Sharonville, OH)
 Crosley Flea
 Crosley Moonbeam C-1
 Crosley Moonbeam C-2
 Crosley Moonbeam C-3
 Crosley Moonbeam C-4
 Crosley Power Glider

Cross-Foster 

((Dr Walter M) Cross-(Jack E) Foster Aircraft Corp, Kansas City, MO)
 Cross-Foster CF-1

Crossland 

(Aviation Construction Engr Co, Chicago, IL)
 Crossland Ace

Crouch-Bolas 

(1931: (R J Goodman) Crouch-(Harold) Bolas, 21 Campbell St, Pawtucket, RI)
 Crouch-Bolas Dragon
 Crouch-Bolas Dragonfly
 Crouch-Bolas B-40 Pursuit
 Crouch-Bolas B-37 Speed Ranger

Crouch-Sowers 

 Crouch-Sowers Special

Crowder

(Hugh Crowder)
 Crowder Blue Teal Custom

Crown 

  Crown Custombuilt B-3

Cruizaire 

((W G) Dunn Mfg Co, Clarinda, IA)
 Cruizaire 1929 Monoplane

Crumley 

(Crumley Multiplane Co.)
 Crumley 1912 Aeroplane

Crump 
(Thomas Charles Crump, Grand Rapids, MI)
 Crump Low-Wing

Crusader
(Crusader Aircraft Corporation)
 Crusader AG-4
 Crusader AG-7

CSA 

(Czech Sport Aircraft formerly CZAW)
 CSA Parrot
 CSA PS-10 Tourer
 CSA PS-28 Cruiser

CSC 

(CSC Aircraft Company)
 CSC Maiden Saginaw

CSIR 

(Council for Scientific and Industrial Research)
 CSIR Experimental Autogyro II

CSIRO 

(Commonwealth Scientific and Industrial Research Organisation)
 CSIRO Mantis

CSS 

(Centralne Studium Samolotów – Central Aircraft Studies)
 CSS-10
 CSS-11
 CSS-12
 CSS-13
 CSS-S-13

CTA
(Centro Técnico Aeroespacial)
 CTA BF-1 Beija-Flôr
 CTA Convertiplano
 CTA Paulistinha 56

CUB 

 CUB Prospector
 CUB Cub

Cub Crafters 

 CubCrafters Top Cub
 CubCrafters CC11-160 Carbon Cub SS
 CubCrafters CC11-100 Sport Cub S2 – an O-200 powered LSA variant [4]
 CubCrafters Carbon Cub EX – An experimental kit variant of the Carbon Cub SS
 CubCrafters NX Cub – nosewheel addition
 CubCrafters CC18-180 Top Cub
 CubCrafters CC19-180 XCub

Cukurs 

(Herberts Cukurs) – Latvia
 Cukurs C.1 Auseklits
 Cukurs C.2
 Cukurs C.3 Kurzemes Hercogiene
 Cukurs C.4
 Cukurs C.6 – Tris Zvaigznes
 Cukurs C.6bis

Culp

(Culp's Specialties, Shreveport, LA)
Culp MonoCulp
Culp Pup
Culp Special

Culver 

(Charles R Culver, Springfield, MA)
 Culver 1910 Pusher Biplane

Culver 

(Lagar R Culver, Farmington, UT)
 Culver 1910 Biplane

Culver 

(Culver Aircraft Company)
 Culver A-8
 Culver PQ-8
 Culver PQ-10
 Culver PQ-14
 Culver PQ-15
 Culver Q-8
 Culver TDC
 Culver TD2C
 Culver TD3C
 Culver TD4C
 Culver UC
 Culver Cadet LAR-90
 Culver Cadet LCA
 Culver Cadet LFA
 Culver Dart G
 Culver V
 Culver V-2
 Culver MR

Cunliffe-Owen 

 Cunliffe-Owen Concordia
 Cunliffe-Owen Aircraft OA-1
 Harlow PJC-2

Cunning 

((Grant S) Cunning Aircraft, Clearfield, UT)
 Cunning Volksplane

Cunningham-Hall 

((Francis E) Cunningham-(Randolph F) Hall Aircraft Corp)
 Cunningham-Hall GA-21M
 Cunningham-Hall GA-36
 Cunningham-Hall PT-6
 Cunningham-Hall X-90

Currie 

(J.R.Currie)
 Currie Wot

Curti
(Curti Aerospace)
 Curti Zefhir

Curtis Wright 

(Curtis A Wright Aeronautical Corp. (unrelated to Curtiss-Wright Corp. - note spelling))
 Curtis Wright C.W.1A Coupe
 Curtis Wright C.W.1H Air Coach
 Curtis Wright C.W.2 Sport Trainer
 Curtis Wright CW-2 Flymobile a.k.a. Wek'copter
 Curtis Wright C.W.4 Commercial
 Curtis Wright C.W.5 Junior Transport
 Curtis Wright C.W.21 a.k.a. 21

Curtiss 

(Curtiss Aeroplane and Motor Company)

Military designations USAAS/USAAF/USAF

 Curtiss A-3 Falcon
 Curtiss A-4 Falcon
 Curtiss A-4 Helldiver civil XF8C-8
 Curtiss A-5 Falcon
 Curtiss A-6 Falcon
 Curtiss A-8 Shrike
 Curtiss A-10 Shrike
 Curtiss A-12 Shrike
 Curtiss A-14 Shrike
 Curtiss A-18 Shrike
 Curtiss A-25 Shrike
 Curtiss A-40
 Curtiss A-43 Blackhawk
 Curtiss AT-4
 Curtiss AT-5
 Curtiss AT-9 Jeep
 Curtiss B-2 Condor
 Curtiss BT-4
 Curtiss C-10 Robin
 Curtiss C-30 Condor
 Curtiss C-46 Commando
 Curtiss C-55 Commando
 Curtiss C-76 Caravan
 Curtiss C-113 Commando
 Curtiss C-143
 Curtiss CO-X
 Curtiss F-87 Blackhawk
 Curtiss GS-1
 Curtiss GS-2
 Curtiss XNBS-4
 Curtiss O-1 Falcon
 Curtiss O-11
 Curtiss O-12
 Curtiss O-13
 Curtiss O-16
 Curtiss O-18
 Curtiss O-24
 Curtiss O-26
 Curtiss O-30
 Curtiss O-39
 Curtiss O-40 Raven
 Curtiss O-52 Owl
 Curtiss P-1 Hawk
 Curtiss P-2 Hawk
 Curtiss P-3 Hawk
 Curtiss P-5 Hawk
 Curtiss P-6 Hawk
 Curtiss P-10
 Curtiss P-11 Hawk
 Curtiss P-14
 Curtiss P-17
 Curtiss P-18
 Curtiss P-19
 Curtiss P-20 Hawk
 Curtiss P-21
 Curtiss P-22 Hawk
 Curtiss P-23 Hawk
 Curtiss P-31
 Curtiss P-36 Hawk
 Curtiss P-37
 Curtiss P-40
 Curtiss P-42
 Curtiss P-46
 Curtiss P-53
 Curtiss P-55 Ascender
 Curtiss P-60
 Curtiss P-62
 Curtiss P-71
 Curtiss P-87 Blackhawk
 Curtiss P-60
 Curtiss XP-934 P-31
 Curtiss PW-8
 Curtiss R-6
 Curtiss R-8 R2C-1 re-build
 Curtiss USAO-1 Licence production of Bristol F.2 Fighter

Military designations USN
 Curtiss BTC
 Curtiss BT2C
 Curtiss BFC Goshawk
 Curtiss BF2C Goshawk
 Curtiss CR
 Curtiss CS
 Curtiss CT
 Curtiss FC
 Curtiss F2C
 Curtiss F3C
 Curtiss-Hall F4C
 Curtiss F5C – designation cancelled to avoid confusion with F-5 flying boats
 Curtiss F6C Hawk
 Curtiss F7C Seahawk
 Curtiss F8C Falcon
 Curtiss F9C Sparrowhawk
 Curtiss F10C Helldiver
 Curtiss F11C Goshawk
 Curtiss F12C
 Curtiss F13C
 Curtiss F14C
 Curtiss F15C
 Curtiss NC
 Curtiss N2C
 Curtiss OC
 Curtiss O2C
 Curtiss O3C
 Curtiss PN-1
 Curtiss RC Kingbird
 Curtiss R2C
 Curtiss R3C
 Curtiss R4C Condor
 Curtiss R5C Commando
 Curtiss SBC
 Curtiss SB2C Helldiver
 Curtiss SB3C
 Curtiss SC Seahawk
 Curtiss S2C Goshawk
 Curtiss S3C
 Curtiss S4C
 Curtiss SNC
 Curtiss SOC Seagull
 Curtiss SO2C
 Curtiss SO3C Seamew

Curtiss aircraft by name

 Curtiss Albany Flyer
 Curtiss America
 Curtiss Autoplane
 Curtiss Banshee Express
 Curtiss Canuck
 Curtiss Carrier Pigeon
 Curtiss Carrier Pigeon 2
 Curtiss Carrier Pigeon CO
 Curtiss Challenger Robin
 Curtiss Canuck
 Curtiss Cleveland
 Curtiss Commercial
 Curtiss Condor
 Curtiss Condor II
 Curtiss Courtney a.k.a. Curtiss-Wright CA-1 Commuter
 Curtiss Crane
 Curtiss Dunkirk Fighter
 Curtiss Eagle
 Curtiss Eagle II
 Curtiss Eagle III
 Curtiss Falcon
 Curtiss Falcon II
 Curtiss Falcon 1910 Biplane
 Curtiss Falcon Conqueror Mailplane
 Curtiss Fledgling
 Curtiss Flying Fish
 Curtiss Freak Boat
 Curtiss Gulfhawk
 Curtiss Hawk I
 Curtiss Hawk II
 Curtiss Hawk III
 Curtiss Hawk IV
 Curtiss Hudson Flyer
 Curtiss Janin Patent Boat
 Curtiss Judson Triplane
 Curtiss Kingbird
 Curtiss Lark
 Curtiss Liberty Battler
 Curtiss Lindbergh Special
 Curtiss Night Mail
 Curtiss Oriole
 Curtiss Osprey
 Curtiss Owl (not O-52)
 Curtiss-Wright Pursuit Osprey
 Curtiss Robin
 Curtiss Seagull MF, 18
 Curtiss Sport Trainer
 Curtiss Tadpole
 Curtiss Tanager
 Curtiss Teal
 Curtiss Thrush
 Curtiss Triad
 Curtiss Valkyrie
 Curtiss Wanamaker Triplane

Curtiss number designations

(assigned retroactively in 1935, with 75 being first contemporary use of system)
 Curtiss 1 JN-4
 Curtiss 2 R/R-2
 Curtiss 3 Wanamaker Triplane
 Curtiss 4 Commercial
 Curtiss 5 N
 Curtiss 6 America/H/H-1/H-2/H-4/H-8/H-12/H-16
 Curtiss 7 F/FL/Judson Triplane
 Curtiss 8 HS
 Curtiss 9 L
 Curtiss 10 S/Scout/Wireless Scout
 Curtiss 11 Autoplane
 Curtiss 12 NC
 Curtiss 13 BAT
 Curtiss 14 BAP
 Curtiss 15 18B Hornet and 18T Wasp
 Curtiss 16 HA/Dunkirk Fighter
 Curtiss 17 Oriole
 Curtiss 18 MF
 Curtiss 19 Eagle
 Curtiss 20 Crane
 Curtiss 21 PN-1
 Curtiss 22 Cox Racer
 Curtiss 23 CR/R-6
 Curtiss 24 CT
 Curtiss 25 Seagull
 Curtiss 26 Orenco D
 Curtiss 28 TS
 Curtiss 29 SX4-1 Water Glider
 Curtiss 30 Curtiss production of Martin NBS-1 bombers
 Curtiss 31 CS
 Curtiss 32 R2C/R-8 racers
 Curtiss 33 XPW-8/PW-8
 Curtiss 34 P-1/AT-4/AT-5
 Curtiss 35 Hawk
 Curtiss 36 NBS-1
 Curtiss 37 Export Falcon/XF8C-1
 Curtiss 39 F4C/F6C
 Curtiss 40 Carrier Pigeon
 Curtiss 41 Lark
 Curtiss 42 R3C
 Curtiss 43 F7C
 Curtiss 47 Hawk II/Goshawk
 Curtiss 48 Fledgling/N2C
 Curtiss 49 F8C Helldiver
 Curtiss 50A Challenger Robin
 Curtiss 51 Fledgling/N2C
 Curtiss 52 B-2 Condor
 Curtiss 53 CO Condor
 Curtiss 55 Kingbird
 Curtiss 56 Thrush
 Curtiss 57 Teal
 Curtiss 58 F9C Sparrowhawk
 Curtiss 59 A-8/A-10/Shrike
 Curtiss 60 A-8B/A-12/Shrike
 Curtiss 62 O-40 Raven
 Curtiss 63 P-23 Hawk
 Curtiss 64 BF2C-1/XF11C-2
 Curtiss 66 P-31
 Curtiss 67 XF11C-3/XBF2C-1
 Curtiss 68 Hawk IV
 Curtiss 69 S2C
 Curtiss 70 F13C
 Curtiss 71 O3C/SOC Seagull
 Curtiss 72 Falcon II
 Curtiss 73 Falcon
 Curtiss 73 F12C
 Curtiss 75 Hawk/P-36/P-37/Mohawk
 Curtiss 76 A-14/Shrike
 Curtiss 76A A-18/Shrike
 Curtiss 77 SBC
 Curtiss 79 Hawk IV
 Curtiss 81 Hawk/Tomahawk/Kittyhawk/Warhawk/P-40
 Curtiss 82 SO3C Seagull
 Curtiss 84 A-25/SB2C Helldiver
 Curtiss 85 O-52 Owl
 Curtiss 86 P-46
 Curtiss 87 Kittyhawk/Warhawk/P-40
 Curtiss 88 P-53
 Curtiss 90 P-60
 Curtiss 91 P-62
 Curtiss 94 F14C
 Curtiss 95 P-60
 Curtiss 96 BTC
 Curtiss 97 SC Seahawk
 Curtiss 98 BT2C
 Curtiss 99 F15C

Curtiss letter designations

 Curtiss AB AB-1 to AB-5
 Curtiss AH AH-1 to AH-18
 Curtiss AX-1
 Curtiss BAP
 Curtiss BAT
 Curtiss BT Flying Lifeboat
 Curtiss C C-1 to C-5
 Curtiss C-1 Canada
 Curtiss CB Battleplane
 Curtiss CO Condor
 Curtiss Model D
 Curtiss Model E
 Curtiss EC-1 Scout
 Curtiss Ely 1910 Monoplane
 Curtiss Model F
 Curtiss FL blend of F and L
 Curtiss Model G Scout
 Curtiss GS
 Curtiss Model H
 Curtiss HA Dunkirk Fighter
 Curtiss HS
 Curtiss J
 Curtiss JN
 Curtiss JN Twin
 Curtiss JNH
 Curtiss JNS
 Curtiss K
 Curtiss KPB
 Curtiss KPL
 Curtiss Model L
 Curtiss LXC1
 Curtiss M
 Curtiss MF
 Curtiss Model N
 Curtiss Model O
 Curtiss PN-1 Pursuit Night
 Curtiss Model R 2/R-2
 Curtiss RA
 Curtiss Model S Scout/Wireless Scout
 Curtiss Model T
 Curtiss T-2
 Curtiss T-32 Condor II (Curtiss-Wright CW-4)(USN R4C)(USAAF YC-30)(Company AT-32, BT-32, Connecticut-32)
 Curtiss X-1

Curtiss collaborative ventures

 Curtiss-Beachey Biplane
 Curtiss-Bleecker SX-5-1 Helicopter
 Curtiss-Cox Cactus Kitten
 Curtiss-Cox Texas Wildcat
 Curtiss-Frisbie
 Curtiss-Goupil Duck
 Curtiss-Herring D
 Curtiss-Ireland Comet
 Curtiss Orenco D
 Curtiss-Reid Rambler
 Curtiss-Robertson CR-1 Skeeter
 Curtiss-Robertson CR-2 Coupe
 Curtiss-Robertson Robin
 Curtiss-Sikorsky-Gluhareff JN-4D
 Curtiss-Sikorsky-Gluhareff Oriole
 Curtiss-SPAD XIII
 Curtiss-Stewart JN-4C
 Curtiss-Stinson

Curtiss-Wright

Curtiss-Wright, (not to be confused with Curtis Wright)
 Curtiss-Wright 2500 Air-Car
 Curtiss-Wright Aircoach
 Curtiss-Wright Bee
 Curtiss-Wright Bunting I
 Curtiss-Wright Courtney Amphibian
 Curtiss-Wright CA-1 Commuter
 Curtiss-Wright CR-1 Skeeter
 Curtiss-Wright CR-2 Coupe
 Curtiss-Wright CW-1 Junior
 Curtiss-Wright CW-3 Duckling
 Curtiss-Wright CW-4 T-32 Condor II
 Curtiss-Wright CW-6 Sedan/Travel Air 6000/6B
 Curtiss-Wright CW-10 Travel Air 10B
 Curtiss-Wright CW-12 Travel Air 12
 Curtiss-Wright CW-14 Travel Air/Speedwing/Sportsman Deluxe/Osprey
 Curtiss-Wright CW-15 Club Sedan 
 Curtiss-Wright CW-16 Travel Air 16
 Curtiss-Wright CW-17 Pursuit Osprey
 Curtiss-Wright CW-18
 Curtiss-Wright CW-19 Coupe/Sparrow
 Curtiss-Wright CW-20 C-46/C-55/C-113 Commando
 Curtiss-Wright CW-21 Demon
 Curtiss-Wright CW-22 SNC Falcon
 Curtiss-Wright CW-23 Coupe
 Curtiss-Wright CW-24 XP-55 Ascender
 Curtiss-Wright CW-24B Flying scale XP-55
 Curtiss-Wright CW-25 AT-9 Jeep
 Curtiss-Wright CW-27 C-76 Caravan
 Curtiss-Wright CW-29 XF-87 Blackhawk
 Curtiss-Wright LXC
 Curtiss Wright Navy Experimental Type C Amphibious Transport
 Curtiss-Wright VZ-7
 Curtiss-Wright X-19 (X-100 and X-200)
 Curtiss-Wright X-100 X-19 development
 Curtiss-Wright X-200 X-19 development

Custer
(1939: National Aircraft Corp (Fdr: Willard R Custer), Hagerstown, MD, 1951: Construction by Baumann Aircraft Corp, Santa Barbara, CA)
 Custer Channel Wing
 Custer CCW-1
 Custer CCW-2
 Custer CCW-5

Custom Flight
(Custom Flight Limited, Midland, Ontario, Canada)
Custom Flight Lite Star
Custom Flight North Star

Cuvelier-Lacroix 
(Roland Cuvellier, Léon Lacroix)
 Cuvelier LNB.11
 Cuvelier LNB.12
 Cuvelier-Lacroix 2L.12 le Manouche

Cuthbertson 
(Michigan Steel Boat Co, Detroit, MI)
 Cuthbertson 1909 Biplane

Cvjetkovic 
 Cvjetkovic CA-51
 Cvjetkovic CA-61 Mini-Ace
 Cvjetkovic CA-65 Skyfly

CVV 
(Centro Volo a Vela del Politecnico di Milano / Centro Studi ad Ezperienze per il Volo a Vela)
 CVV 1 Pinguino
 CVV 2 Asiago
 CVV 3 Arcore
 CVV 4 Pellicano
 CVV 5 Papero
 CVV 6 Canguro
 CVV 7 Pinocchio
 CVV 8 Linate
 CVV 8 Bonaventura
 CVV PR.2 Saltafossi (Ditch-Hopper)
 CVV PM.280 Tartuca (Tortoise): 1947 low-wing single-seater racer, 60 hp CNA D.4 
 CVV PM.80 Tartuca [typo?]
 CVV P.110
 CVV P.111
 CVV P.19 Scricciolo (Wren)
 CVV P.19Tr – tricycle undercarriage
 CVV P.19R – (Rimorchio – tug) rebuild with 150 hp Lycoming for use as glider tug

CW
(CW Helicopter Research)
 CW 205

C.W.
(C.W. Aircraft Ltd.)
 C.W. Cygnet
 C.W. Cygnet Minor
 C.W. Swan.

CWL 
(Centralne Warsztaty Lotnicze – Central Aviation Workshops)
 WZ-III
 WZ-IV
 CWL WZ-VIII
 CWL WZ-IX
 CWL WZ-X
 CWL SK-1 Słowik (developed from Hannover CL.II)

Cyclone 
(Cyclone Airsports Ltd)
 Cyclone AX2000

Cycloplane 
(Cycloplane Co Ltd (founders: H S "Dick" Myhres, Omer L Woodson), 3781 Angeles Mesa Dr, Los Angeles, CA)
 Wheeler Cycloplane A-1
 Cycloplane C-1
 Cycloplane C-2

Cyclops 
(Zaharoff Aeronautical Corp of America, 55 W 42 St, New York, NY)
 Cyclops Z-II
 Cyclops Z-IV

CZAL 
(Czechoslovakia, late 40s – early 50s)
 CZAL L-60 Brigadyr
 CZAL HC-2 Helibaby

CZAW
 CZAW Parrot
 CZAW SportCruiser a.k.a. PiperSport
 CZAW Mermaid

Czech Sport Aircraft
(Czech Sport Aircraft)
 Czech Sport Aircraft Sky Cruiser
 CSA PS-38 Tourer

References

Further reading

External links

 List of aircraft (C)